Malcolm William James Richard Wells,   (19 June 1941 – 6 January 1993), commonly known as Richard J. Wells, was a British nurse, nursing adviser and health care administrator.

Wells was born in South Africa during the Second World War. His career in nursing was largely based at the Royal Marsden Hospital, where he held various positions, including Director of the Marie Curie Rehabilitation Centre.

He served as a consultant to a host of organizations, including the World Health Organization, the International Union Against Cancer, the International Council of Nurses and the European Oncology Society.

As Oncology Nursing Adviser at the Royal College of Nursing, Wells helped shape the nursing response to  HIV infection and AIDS in the UK. He was made a Fellow of the Royal College of Nursing in 1987.

Wells died in London in 1993. The Richard Wells Research Centre at West London University is named in his honour.

References

External links
National Health Executive website
NHIVNA.org
Royal Marsden Hospital website

1950 births
1993 deaths
British nurses
British nursing administrators
Commanders of the Order of the British Empire
Fellows of the Royal College of Nursing
Male nurses
South African emigrants to the United Kingdom